It's a Bet is a 1935 British comedy drama film directed by Alexander Esway and starring Gene Gerrard, Helen Chandler and Judy Kelly. It was made at Elstree Studios by British International Pictures. The film's sets were designed by the art director David Rawnsley.

Synopsis
A young English reporter makes a bet with a wealthy publisher that he can disappear for a month. In his absence the publisher makes much of the mysterious disappearance in an attempt to boost the circulation of his newspaper.

Cast
 Gene Gerrard as Rollo Briggs  
 Helen Chandler as Clare  
 Judy Kelly as Anne  
 Allen Vincent as Norman 
 Dudley Rolph as Harry  
 Nadine March as Mis Parsons  
 Polly Ward as Maudie  
 Alf Goddard as Joe  
 Jimmy Godden as Mayor  
 Frank Stanmore as Tramp  
 Ronald Shiner as Fair Man  
 Ellen Pollock as Mrs. Joe 
 Violet Farebrother as Lady 
 George Zucco as Convict  
 Raymond Raikes
 Syd Crossley
 Charlotte Parry

References

Bibliography
 Low, Rachael. Filmmaking in 1930s Britain. George Allen & Unwin, 1985.
 Wood, Linda. British Films, 1927-1939. British Film Institute, 1986.

External links
 
 
 

1935 films
1935 comedy-drama films
British black-and-white films
British comedy-drama films
Films shot at British International Pictures Studios
Films directed by Alexander Esway
Films set in London
1930s English-language films
1930s British films